Daniel Eugen Baston (born 7 June 1973) is a Romanian former footballer.

Career
Baston played for FC Dinamo Bucharest in the Romanian league before moving abroad to play for SD Compostela at age 25. He signed a two-year contract with the Spanish Segunda División club in August 1998. He would later play for Ukrainian Premier League side FC Metalurh Zaporizhya.

References

External links

1973 births
People from Roman, Romania
Living people
Romanian footballers
Serbian White Eagles FC players
ASC Oțelul Galați players
FC Dinamo București players
SD Compostela footballers
FC Politehnica Iași (1945) players
CSM Ceahlăul Piatra Neamț players
FC Astra Giurgiu players
FC Gloria Buzău players
FC Metalurh Zaporizhzhia players
CFR Cluj players
Liga I players
Segunda División players
Ukrainian Premier League players
Cypriot First Division players
Canadian Soccer League (1998–present) players
Romanian expatriate footballers
Expatriate footballers in Cyprus
Romanian expatriate sportspeople in Cyprus
Expatriate footballers in Spain
Romanian expatriate sportspeople in Spain
Expatriate footballers in Ukraine
Romanian expatriate sportspeople in Ukraine
Expatriate soccer players in Canada
Romanian expatriate sportspeople in Canada
Association football forwards